Aliabad (also Romanized as ‘Alīābād) is a village in Howmeh Rural District, in the Central District of Gilan-e Gharb County, Kermanshah Province, Iran. At the 2006 census, its population was 41, in 9 families.

References 

Populated places in Gilan-e Gharb County